Kalka Mail (Officially as Netaji Express) is the oldest running train in India. This train connects Howrah in Kolkata, capital of the State of West Bengal to Kalka in the North-Western state of  Haryana. Kalka is the railhead for the Kalka-Shimla Railway which connects to Shimla, the one time summer capital of the British Raj.

Overview
Kalka Mail aka Netaji Express at present is the oldest trains running in the country, it has a total of 24 coaches (eleven Sleeper Class coaches, two SLR coaches, two General Class coaches, one First AC-cum-AC Two Tier coach, three AC Three Tier coaches , three AC Two Tier coaches , one Second class-seating and one Pantry Car) and has total 4 Rakes. This train is categorized as superfast-mail and runs at a maximum speed of 120 km/hrs. The train stops at 37 stations in its entire route, thus passengers boarding the train have to abide by distance restriction (the minimum travel distance is 160 km in all AC classes and 480 km in Sleeper and 2S). However, it carries all passengers on the Delhi-Kalka route.

Due to the passenger demand, one AC Two Tier Coach, one AC Three Tier Coach, five Sleeper Class coach, one General Class coach, the RMS coach, one SLR coach and the Pantry Car is  separately reserved for the passengers boarding from Chandigarh Junction only. Hence these eleven coaches are attached during the journey towards Howrah in Chandigarh and is detached during its journey towards Kalka in Chandigarh only.

History
Run by the East Indian Railway Company, the train (originally numbered 1 Up / 2 Dn) began operation between Calcutta and Delhi in 1866 as the "East Indian Railway Mail". Its run was extended from Delhi to Kalka in 1891. The train was the principal mechanism by which British civil servants moved to their summer capital in Simla from Calcutta with the entire government machinery traveling on the train at the start of the summer months and returning by it at the end of summer. Both stations, Howrah as well as Kalka, had internal carriageways running along the platform so that the Viceroy and other high-ranking officers could drive right up to their rail coaches. The carriageway at Howrah is still used and runs between Platforms 8 and 9 but the carriageway at Kalka has been converted into platform. With the rationalization of train numbering in the 1990s, the Kalka Mail lost its 1 Up /2 Dn numbering and is now it run as 12311 from Howrah and 12312 from Kalka. The train was renamed Netaji Express in honor of the Indian leader Subhas Chandra Bose. Bose was thought to have escaped from Gomoh to Peshawar on this train from Gomoh Railway Station.

Traction
As the route is fully electrified, it is generally hauled by a WAP 7 of Tughlakabad, Howrah or Sealdah shed, end to end. Sometimes, it is also hauled by a WAP 4.

In popular culture
Kalka Mail is featured in a short story by Satyajit Ray, the Indian film director and writer. In the story, The Mystery of the Kalka Mail (Baksho Rahasya), the three main characters travel from Calcutta to Delhi and on to Kalka on the train. The plot involves a stolen diamond and an unpublished manuscript. The story was also made into a radio play and a film.

Renaming
Kalka Mail was renamed to Netaji Express in honour of Netaji Subhash Chandra Bose to commemorate his 124th Birth Anniversary on 23 January 2021.

Accidents

Fatehpur derailment, 2011

15 coaches of the Kalka Mail derailed on the Kanpur-Fatehpur line near the Fatehpur railway station on the afternoon of 10 July 2011. Causation is unsolved though poor maintenance of the locomotive is suspected because the engine had begun swaying sideways just before the accident. More than 69 persons died and 200 were injured. The injured were taken to hospitals in Kanpur, Lucknow and Allahabad.

References

Transport in Kalka
Rail transport in Howrah
Rail transport in Jharkhand
Rail transport in Bihar
Rail transport in Uttar Pradesh
Rail transport in Delhi
Rail transport in Haryana
Railway services introduced in 1866
Rail transport in West Bengal
Mail trains in India